The 1st AIBA European 2004 Olympic Qualifying Tournament was held in Plovdiv, Bulgaria from March 30 to April 4, 2004 during the annual Strandjata Boxing Tournament. It was the first chance for amateur boxers from Europe to qualify for the 2004 Summer Olympics after the European Championships in Pula, Croatia. The number one and two in six weight divisions earned a ticket for the Olympic Tournament in Athens, Greece.

Medal winners

Qualified

Light Flyweight (– 48 kg)

Bantamweight (– 54 kg)

Lightweight (– 60 kg)

Welterweight (– 69 kg)

Light Heavyweight (– 81 kg)

Super Heavyweight (+ 91 kg)

See also
2004 European Amateur Boxing Championships
2nd AIBA European 2004 Olympic Qualifying Tournament
3rd AIBA European 2004 Olympic Qualifying Tournament
4th AIBA European 2004 Olympic Qualifying Tournament

References
amateur-boxing

European 1
2004 in Bulgarian sport